Harmstorf may refer to:

 Raimund Harmstorf, actor
 Rudolf Harmstorf, sailor
 Harmstorf, German municipality

See also
 Harmsdorf (disambiguation)